Hannathon, and of the 1350-1335 BC Amarna letters, Hinnatuna, or Hinnatuni/Hinnatunu, is the Biblical city/city-state of Hannathon, (meaning: "the Gift of Grace"); in the Amarna letters correspondence as Hinnatuna, it is a site in southern Canaan, site uncertain. Ancient settlement of Tel Hanaton in Lower Galilee has been suggested as a candidate.

Amarna letters mentioning Hinnatuna 
Hinnatuna is referenced in 2 Amarna letters, EA 8, and EA 245 ('EA' stands for 'El Amarna').

Amarna letter EA 8 is a letter to Pharaoh by Burna-Buriash of Karaduniyaš-(i.e. Babylon). The letter, entitled: "Merchants murdered, vengeance demanded", states near the letter beginning: "...Now, my merchants who were on their way with Ahu-tabu, were detained in Canaan for business matters. After Ahu-tabu went on to my brother-(the pharaoh), –in Hinnatuna of Canaan, Šum-Adda, the son of Balumme, and Šutatna, the son of Šaratum of Akka-(modern Acre), having sent their men, killed my merchants and took away [th]eir money."

Burna-Buriash continues, and states that he demands retribution, as well as he makes a warning to the pharaoh, that his own merchants/envoys are in danger.

Letter EA 245, title: "Assignment of guilt"
Letter EA 245, to pharaoh, letter no. 4 of 7 by Biridiya, concerns the rebel, and mayor of Shechem-(Amarna Šakmu), Labayu, and his cohort and protector: Surata of Akka-(modern Acre, Israel).
EA 245 is the second tablet of a 2–Tablet letter-(Part 1 lost).
Letter Part 2 of 2:
(1-7)"Moreover, I urged my brothers, "If the god of the king, our lord, brings it about that we overcome Lab'ayu, then we must bring him alive: ha-ia-ma to the king, our lord."
(8-12)My mare, however, having been put out of action: tu-ra (having been shot), I took my place behind him: ah-ru-un-ú and rode with Yašdata.
(13-20)But before my arrival they had struck him down: ma-ah-sú-ú,-(mahāsū). Yašdata being truly your servant, he it was that entered with me into batt[le] .
(21-47)(bottom/tablet and reverse)May ... [...] the life of the king, my [lord], that he may br[ing peace to ever]yone in [the lands of] the king, [my] lord. It had been Surata that took Lab'ayu from Magidda and said to me, "I will send him to the king by boat: a-na-yi." Surata took him, but he sent him from Hinnatunu to his home, for it was Surata that had accepted from him: ba-di-ú his ransom.
(?41-47)Moreover, what have I done to the king, my lord, that he has treated me with contempt: ia8-qí-ìl-li-ni and honored: ia8-ka-bi-id my less important brothers?
(?41-47)It was Surata that let Lab'ayu go, and it was Surata that let Ba'l-mehir go, (both) to their homes. And may the king, my lord, know."  -EA 245, lines 1-47 (complete, (minor 1-sentence lacuna))(Letter Part 2 of 2; Letter Part 1–lost)

See also
Biridiya of Megiddo
Yašdata
Labaya
Surata (Akka mayor), Akka/Acre, Israel
Amarna letters
Tel Hanaton
Hanaton

Amarna letters (photos)

External links
EA 245-(Obverse) EA 245-(Reverse); Article-1; Article-2; Note: Reverse up-side-down to Front.

References
Moran, William L. The Amarna Letters. Johns Hopkins University Press, 1987, 1992. (softcover)

Amarna letters locations
Canaanite cities
Former populated places in Southwest Asia